Casper von Koskull (born September 1960) is a Finnish banker, the president and CEO of Nordea Bank Abp, the Nordic financial services group operating in Northern Europe, since 1 November 2015, when he succeeded Christian Clausen. He is member of noble family of Koskull.

Von Koskull has a master's degree in Economics and an MBA from Aalto University. He worked in investment banking as a managing director and partner at Goldman Sachs for many years.

Before becoming CEO in 2015, von Koskull was Nordea's head of wholesale banking since 2010.

Casper von Koskull has announced his retirement in 2020.

References

1960 births
Living people
Finnish bankers
20th-century Finnish nobility
Swedish-speaking Finns
Aalto University alumni
Place of birth missing (living people)
21st-century Finnish nobility
Casper